Sidney Arnold (born 1933) is an American former figure skater.  She competed in ice dance with Franklin Nelson. Her name was Sidney Foster before her marriage in July 1955 to ensign John Arnold.

Results
(with Franklin Nelson)

References

1933 births
Living people
American female ice dancers
21st-century American women